James Romley Hughes (May 12, 1906 — January 4, 1983) was a Canadian professional ice hockey player who played 40 games in the National Hockey League with the Detroit Cougars during the 1929–30 season. The rest of his career, which lasted from 1925 to 1937, was spent in various minor leagues.

Career statistics

Regular season and playoffs

External links
 

1906 births
1983 deaths
Buffalo Bisons (IHL) players
Canadian expatriate ice hockey players in the United States
Canadian ice hockey defencemen
Detroit Cougars players
Detroit Olympics (IHL) players
Ice hockey people from Ontario
Kansas City Greyhounds players
Niagara Falls Cataracts players
People from Sudbury District
Pittsburgh Shamrocks players
St. Louis Flyers (AHA) players
Syracuse Stars (IHL) players
Windsor Bulldogs (1929–1936) players
Windsor Bulldogs (CPHL) players
Winnipeg Maroons players